Cooks' Cottage, previously known as Captain Cook's Cottage, is located in the Fitzroy Gardens, Melbourne, Australia.   The cottage was constructed in 1755 in the English village of Great Ayton, North Yorkshire, by the parents of Captain James Cook, James and Grace Cook, and was brought to Melbourne in 1934 by Sir Russell Grimwade. It is a point of conjecture among historians whether James Cook, the famous navigator, ever lived in the house, but almost certainly he visited his parents at the house.

The inside of the cottage includes centuries-old antiques and is stylised in the way of the 18th century, as are the clothes of the volunteer guides.

History
In 1933, the owner of the cottage decided to sell it with a condition of sale that the building remain in England. She was persuaded to change "England" to "the Empire", and accepted an Australian bid of £800 (£45,314 or A$80,556 in 2023 terms) by Russell Grimwade, as opposed to the highest local offer of £300 (£16,993 or A$30,209 in 2023 terms).

The cottage was deconstructed brick by brick and packed into 253 cases and 40 barrels for shipping on board the Port Dunedin from Hull. Cuttings from ivy that adorned the house were also taken and planted when the house was re-erected in Melbourne. Grimwade, a notable businessman and philanthropist, donated the house to the people of Victoria for the centenary anniversary of the settlement of Melbourne in October 1934.

The cottage immediately became a popular tourist attraction. In 1978, further restoration work was carried out on the cottage. An English cottage garden has been established around the house, further adding to its period reconstruction. Very few of the items in the house are from the Cook family, but all of the items are representative furnishings of the period.

In popular culture
The cottage features in two scenes of the 2012 movie Any Questions for Ben?.

Gallery

See also
 Stewart Park, Middlesbrough – site of the cottage where Captain James Cook was born.

References

External links
 

James Cook
Relocated houses
Museums in Melbourne
Houses completed in 1755
Houses in Melbourne
Historic house museums in Victoria (Australia)
East Melbourne, Victoria
Landmarks in Melbourne
1934 establishments in Australia
Buildings and structures in the City of Melbourne (LGA)
Cottages